Javier Gutiérrez may refer to:
Javier Gutiérrez Álvarez (born 1971), Spanish actor
Javier Gutiérrez Cuevas (born 1985), Spanish cross-country skier
Javier Gutiérrez Berlinches (born 1988), Spanish footballer